3O or 3-O may refer to:

3J, IATA code for Jubba Airways
3O, IATA code for Air Arabia Maroc
3o Sector, see Tertiary sector of the economy
3-O-sulfation, a phenomenon occurring in Heparan sulfate

See also
O3 (disambiguation)